HMS Blyth is a  formerly of the British Royal Navy. She was the second vessel to bear the name. The vessel served in the Middle East as part of the 9th Mine Countermeasures Squadron. In 2021, the minehunter was decommissioned and following a refit, planned to be transferred to an unspecified non-European navy (a plan subsequently altered to transfer her to the Romanian Navy instead).

Service history
Along with her sister ship, she was deployed to the Middle East on Operation Aintree in 2007 and 2008 to test the class capabilities in the hot climate and maintain force operational capability in the region. Crews from other Sandown-class vessels were rotated through the two ships.

Both Blyth and Ramsey were decommissioned in a joint ceremony at Rosyth on 4 August 2021. Following a refit by Babcock both vessels were initially earmarked for the Ukrainian Navy to "enjoy a fresh lease of life in the Black Sea". However, in October 2022 it was reported that both ships would be transferred to the Romanian Navy instead.

References

External links

 

Sandown-class minehunters
Ships built in Southampton
2000 ships
Minehunters of the United Kingdom